Allgreave is a village in Cheshire, England.  It lies on the A54 (Buxton to Congleton) road, near to the border with Staffordshire.

Allgreave Methodist Chapel is situated in a sharp bend of the A54. The Rose and Crown public house also stands on the main road.

Villages in Cheshire